The 1978 Montreal Alouettes finished the season in 2nd place in the Eastern Conference with an 8–7–1 record and appeared in the Grey Cup. The Alouettes would fail to defend their Grey Cup title, losing the championship game to the Edmonton Eskimos, who they had defeated a year earlier.

Preseason

Regular season

Standings

Schedule

Postseason

Grey Cup

References

External links
Official Site

Montreal Alouettes seasons
James S. Dixon Trophy championship seasons
1978 Canadian Football League season by team
1970s in Montreal
1978 in Quebec